Nokia 5300 XpressMusic is a slider mobile phone by Nokia, part of the XpressMusic range. It was introduced on 26 September 2006 and released at the end of that year. It runs on Nokia Series 40 3rd Edition FP2.

Overview

The phone has a sleek slider design and features a 240×320 pixels (QVGA) TFT display and a 1.3-megapixel (CMOS) camera which can be used in landscape. It has dedicated music buttons on each side which makes it easy to access tracks in music player mode or tune in different stations in radio mode, with a 2.5 mm. headset jack. It has also a powerful loudspeaker at the back for high quality sound output. It also features a removable MicroSD card with a maximum capacity of 2 GB and powered by an ARM9 CPU running at 237 MHz. Nokia 5300 XpressMusic was launched on T-Mobile's USA network on 1 March 2007.

Nokia 5300 can browse and surf the internet via GPRS. The phone can access different web or mobile sites like Friendster, Yahoo! Mail, Yahoo! Messenger, Google, YouTube, Multiply etc. The phone also features the Active Standby mode which can create shortcuts while on standby mode. It has a dedicated keys on sides let you access to music or just push camera button to start camera or video mode. The best view when you play your video is on panoramic view.

These are the Menu options of Nokia 5300: Contacts, Log, Organizer, Gallery, Messaging, Media, Applications, Web, Settings, PTT and the user's SIM network services.

Features

Frequency and power

Operating frequency
 EGSM 900/1800/1900 MHz and EGSM 850/1800/1900 MHz

Power management
 Nokia Battery BL-5B (820mah)
 Talk Time up to 3.2 hours
 Standby Time up to 223 hours
 Music time up to 12 hours
(operation times depending on network and usage)

External features

Dimensions
 Volume: 85cc.
 Weight: 106.5 g.
 Length: 92.4 mm.
 Width: 48.2 mm.
 Thickness (max.): 20.7 mm.

Display
 262,144 (262K) color true color TFT QVGA 320 × 240 pixels, 2' LCD display

User interface
 S40 user interface
 Dedicated music keys for play, pause, forward and rewind functions
 Side volume keys can be used as zoom keys when camera is activated

Internal features

Imaging features
 Integrated 1.3-megapixel camera with up to 8x digital zoom
 Dedicated camera button
 Landscape camcorder and video player
 Video recording and playback
 Download and upload images and video sequences
 Fun frames and programmable white balance for camera

Multimedia features
 Visual radio, listen to music and interact to favorite radio stations
 Playback video formats
 Integrated FM radio
 New S40 music player
 Integrated music player for MP3/AAC/eAAC+/AAC+/WMA/AMR/Midi formats
 Listen, create playlists and manage music
 Different skins for the music player

Memory functions
 Combo memory with 32 MB flash and 16 MB RAM
 Hot swappable slot for microSD memory card
 Options to expand with microSD card

Messaging features
 Multimedia messaging: MMS for creating, receiving, editing and sending videos and pictures with AMR voice clips
 Email: Supports SMTP, POP3, IMAP4 and APOP protocols
 Attachments: Supports JPEG, GIF, 3GP, MP3, PowerPoint and Excel files
 Text messaging: Supports SMS, picture message, SMS distribution list
 Audio messaging: Records own voice message and send to compatible devices
 Instant Messaging and Presence-enhanced contacts

Applications
 Java MIDP 2.0
 Pre-installed Java applications
 Over-the-air (OTA) download of Java-based applications and games
 3 pre-installed games when it purchased

Pre-installed games
Music Guess
Pro Snowboard
Snake III

Ringing tones
 64-chord/voice polyphonic MIDI ringing tones
 Supported file formats include MP3, True Tones, AAC, 64-chord/voice polyphonic MIDI tones
 Video ring-tones
 Alert and gaming tones

Connectivity
 A2DP to support Bluetooth stereo headset for high quality, wireless audio transfer
 Infrared (IR)
 Remote OTA synchronization with SyncML
 Mini USB interface with USB 2.0
 Local/remote synchronization with PC using PC Suite
 New 2.5 mm. Nokia AV connector
 Push to talk over cellular network (network dependent)

Browsing and data transfer
 xHTML over TCP/IP
 Full OMA Digital Rights Management 2.0 for content protection
 Data transfer: GPRS and EGPRS multislots class 10
 HSCSD/CSD for data modem

Personal information management (PIM)
 Advance series 40 PIM features including calendar, contacts, and to-do list
 Alarm clock
 Reminders
 Calculator
 New and enhanced calendar view

Other features
 Internal antenna
 Animated color screensaver
 Changeable color themes, user-defined themes
 Nokia Sensor
 Flash lite player 2.0
 Plug and Play mobile devices
 Nokia Audio Manager and Windows Media Player
 Nokia Catalogs
 Nokia Widsets, Google Map and Yahoo! Go (free downloads)
 Covers: Available colors in Grey-White, Lilac-White, Black-White, All Black cover and the famous Red-White

Sales package contents
 Nokia 5300 XpressMusic phone
 Nokia Battery BL-5B
 Nokia Standard Charger AC-3
 Nokia Stereo Headset HS-47
 Nokia MicroSD Card
 Mini USB cable
 Universal headphone adapter
 CD-ROM for PC Suite
 User Guide manual

Differences of 5300 and 5200

The Nokia 5300 is generally comparable with the Nokia 5200.
Talk: 3.2 hoursStandby: 233 hours

In media 
The phone is shown in the Fall Out Boy "This Ain't a Scene, It's an Arms Race", "Thnks fr th Mmrs" and The Academy Is... "We've Got a Big Mess on Our Hands" music video.

Related handsets
 Nokia 5200 (Slide)
 Nokia 5610 (Slide)
 Nokia 5310 (Slim)
 Nokia 5320 (3G Phone)
 Nokia 5800 (Touchscreen)
 Nokia 5220 (Asymmetric)
 Nokia 5130 (Candybar)
 Nokia 5700 (Twist)

References

External links

 Official Nokia 5300 XpressMusic site
 Nokia 5300 on Nokia Asia Pacific website

5300
Mobile phones introduced in 2006
Mobile phones with infrared transmitter
Slider phones